The 7. Fallschirmjäger-Division (7th Parachute Division) was a fallschirmjäger (airborne) division of the German military during the Second World War, active from 1944 to 1945.

The division was first formed as Fallschirmjäger-Division Erdmann in August 1944, from a collection of training units and remnants of other formations, named for its commander Wolfgang Erdmann. It fought at Arnhem during Operation Market-Garden in September, and in October was redesignated as the 7. Fallschirmjäger-Division. It contained the 19th, 20th and 21st Fallschirmjäger Regiments, and the 7th Fallschirmjäger Artillery Regiment.

The division fought on the Western Front for the remainder of the war, surrendering at Oldenburg with the end of hostilities.

Notes

References

Fallschirmjäger divisions
Military units and formations established in 1944
Military units and formations disestablished in 1945